Glendalough railway station is a railway station on the Transperth network in Perth, Western Australia. It is located on the Joondalup line, five kilometres from Perth station serving the suburb of Glendalough.

History
Glendalough station opened on 28 February 1993 in the median strip of the Mitchell Freeway where it crosses over Scarborough Beach Road via a bridge.

In 2003, the contract for extending the platforms on seven Joondalup line stations, including Glendalough station, was awarded to Lakis Constructions. Along with the extensions, the platform edges were upgraded to bring them into line with tactile paving standards. Work on this station was done in mid-2004.

Services
Glendalough station is connected to Transperth Joondalup line services.

Glendalough station saw 1,081,767 passengers in the 2013–14 financial year.

Platforms
Platforms currently in use are as follows:

Bus routes

References

External links

Joondalup line
Railway stations in Perth, Western Australia
Railway stations in Australia opened in 1993
Transperth railway stations in highway medians
Bus stations in Perth, Western Australia